Damian Stasiak (born February 20, 1990) is a Polish mixed martial artist currently competing in the Featherweight division of the Konfrontacja Sztuk Walki (KSW). A professional competitor since 2011, he formerly competed for the Ultimate Fighting Championship (UFC), M-1 Global, BAMMA, and Absolute Championship Berkut. He is currently ranked #5 in the KSW Featherweight rankings.

Background
Stasiak began training in karate at the age of six, later earning his black belt (International Traditional Karate Federation), and won multiple World Championships in individual Kumite. Stasiak is also accomplished in Brazilian jiu-jitsu, holding the rank of brown belt.

Mixed martial arts career

Early career
Stasiak made his professional debut in November 2011 where he competed primarily in regional promotions across the Eastern Europe, including stints in M-1 Global and BAMMA, where he compiled a record of 8—2 before signing with the UFC in the spring of 2015.

Ultimate Fighting Championship
He made his debut against Yaotzin Meza at UFC Fight Night 64 on April 11, 2014. He lost the back and forth fight by unanimous decision.

Stasiak was briefly linked to a fight with Erik Perez on November 21, 2015 at The Ultimate Fighter Latin America 2 Finale. However, Stasiak was removed from the bout for undisclosed reasons in mid-October and was replaced by Taylor Lapilus.

Stasiak next faced Filip Pejić on April 10, 2016 at UFC Fight Night 86. He won the fight via submission in the first round.

Stasiak faced Davey Grant on October 8, 2016 at UFC 204. He won the fight via submission in the third round.

Stasiak faced Pedro Munhoz on May 28, 2017 at UFC Fight Night 109. He lost the fight by unanimous decision.

Stasiak faced Brian Kelleher on October 21, 2017 at UFC Fight Night 118. He lost the fight via technical knockout in the third round. This fight earned him the Fight of the Night award.

Stasiak met promotional newcomer Liu Pingyuan on July 22, 2018 at UFC Fight Night 134. He lost the fight via unanimous decision.

Stasiak was released by UFC in September 2018.

KSW
After one victory in the regional circuit, Stasiak signed with KSW and faced Antun Račić for the inaugural KSW Bantamweight Championship at KSW 51 on November 9, 2019. Stasiak lost the grappling-heavy contest via unanimous decision.

Stasiak made his sophomore appearance in the organization against Patryk Surdyn at KSW 55 on October 10, 2020. He won the fight via second-round submission.

Stasiak returned to featherweight and faced Andrey Lezhnev on June 5, 2021 at KSW 61. He submitted Lezhnev in the first round via triangle choke.

Stasiak faced Lom-Ali Eskijew on December 18, 2021 at KSW 65: Khalidov vs. Soldić. He lost the bout via unanimous decision.

Stasiak faced Robert Ruchała on October 14, 2022 at KSW 75: Ruchała vs. Stasiak. He lost the close bout via split decision.

Championships and accomplishments
Ultimate Fighting Championship
Fight of the Night (One time) vs. Brian Kelleher

Mixed martial arts record

|-
|Loss
|align=center|13–9
|Robert Ruchała
|Decision (split)
|KSW 75: Ruchała vs. Stasiak
|
|align=center|3
|align=center|5:00
|Nowy Sącz, Poland
|
|-
|Loss
|align=center|13–8
| Lom-Ali Eskijew
| Decision (unanimous)
| KSW 65: Khalidov vs. Soldić
|
|align=center|3
|align=center|5:00
|Gliwice, Poland
|
|-
|Win
|align=center|13–7
|Andrey Lezhnev
|Submission (triangle choke)
|KSW 61: To Fight or Not To Fight
|
|align=center|1 
|align=center|2:41 
|Gdańsk, Poland
|
|-
|Win
|align=center|12–7
| Patryk Surdyn
| Technical Submission (arm-triangle choke)
| KSW 55: Askham vs. Khalidov 2
|
|align=center|2
|align=center|4:17
|Łódź, Poland
| 
|-
|Loss
|align=center|11–7
| Antun Račić
|Decision (unanimous)
||KSW 51: Croatia
|
|align=center|5
|align=center|5:00
|Zagreb, Croatia
|
|-
|Win
|align=center|11–6
|Nikolay Kondratuk
|Technical Submission (arm-triangle choke)
|Rocky Warriors Cartel 2: Turniej Wagi Ciężkiej 
|
|align=center|1
|align=center|1:52
|Golina, Poland
|
|-
|Loss
|align=center|10–6
|Liu Pingyuan
|Decision (unanimous)
|UFC Fight Night: Shogun vs. Smith 
|
|align=center|3
|align=center|5:00
|Hamburg, Germany
|
|-
|Loss
|align=center|10–5
|Brian Kelleher
|TKO (punches)
|UFC Fight Night: Cerrone vs. Till
|
|align=center|3
|align=center|3:39
|Gdańsk, Poland
|
|-
|Loss
|align=center|10–4
|Pedro Munhoz
|Decision (unanimous)
|UFC Fight Night: Gustafsson vs. Teixeira
|
|align=center|3
|align=center|5:00
|Stockholm, Sweden
|
|-
|Win
| align=center| 10–3
| Davey Grant
| Submission (armbar)
| UFC 204
| 
| align=center| 3
| align=center| 3:56
| Manchester, England
|   
|-
| Win
| align=center| 9–3
| Filip Pejić
| Submission (rear-naked choke)
| UFC Fight Night: Rothwell vs. dos Santos
| 
| align=center| 1
| align=center| 2:16
| Zagreb, Croatia
|
|-
| Loss
| align=center| 8–3
| Yaotzin Meza
| Decision (unanimous)
| UFC Fight Night: Gonzaga vs. Cro Cop 2
| 
| align=center| 3
| align=center| 5:00
| Kraków, Poland
| 
|-
| Win
| align=center| 8–2
| Mike Grundy
| Submission (triangle choke)
| BAMMA 19
| 
| align=center| 2
| align=center| 4:18
| Blackpool, England
| 
|-
| Win
| align=center| 7–2
| Kamil Selwa
| Submission (rear-naked choke)
| ACB 13: Poland vs. Russia
| 
| align=center| 1
| align=center| 3:42
| Płock, Poland
| 
|-
| Win
| align=center| 6–2
| Łukasz Grochowski 
| Decision (unanimous)
|rowspan=3 | 3F: Extreme Fight Cage
|rowspan=3 | 
| align=center| 3
| align=center| 5:00
|rowspan=3 | Ełk, Poland
| 
|-
| Win
| align=center| 5–2
| Konrad Sokulski
| Submission (rear-naked choke)
| align=center| 2
| align=center| 2:31
| 
|-
| Win
| align=center| 4–2
| Tomasz Boduszek
| Submission (rear-naked choke)
| align=center| 1
| align=center| 1:32
| 
|-
| Loss
| align=center| 3–2
| Dmitry Silnyagin
| Decision (unanimous)
| VSR: Overtime
| 
| align=center| 3
| align=center| 5:00
| Moscow, Russia
| 
|-
| Loss
| align=center| 3–1
| Magomed Magomedov
| Decision (unanimous)
| M-1 Global Challenge 37
| 
| align=center| 3
| align=center| 5:00
| Orenburg, Russia
| 
|-
| Win
| align=center| 3–0
| Krzysztof Klaczek
| Decision (unanimous)
|rowspan=3 |  PMMAF: Finals
|rowspan=3 |  
| align=center| 2
| align=center| 5:00
|rowspan=3 |  Chorzów, Poland
| 
|-
| Win
| align=center| 2–0
| Pawel Chwalinski
| Submission (rear-naked choke)
| align=center| 1
| align=center| 4:15
| 
|-
| Win
| align=center| 1–0
| Marcin Moskiewski
| KO (punch)
| align=center| 2
| align=center| 2:52
| 
|-

See also
 List of current KSW fighters
List of male mixed martial artists

References

External links
 
 

1990 births
Polish male mixed martial artists
Bantamweight mixed martial artists
Mixed martial artists utilizing karate
Mixed martial artists utilizing Brazilian jiu-jitsu
Living people
People from Zgierz
Polish male karateka
Polish practitioners of Brazilian jiu-jitsu
Ultimate Fighting Championship male fighters